Caecilia subnigricans is a species of caecilian in the family Caeciliidae. It is found in Colombia and Venezuela. Its natural habitats are subtropical or tropical dry forests, subtropical or tropical moist lowland forests, plantations, rural gardens, and heavily degraded former forest.

References

subnigricans
Amphibians of Colombia
Amphibians of Venezuela
Amphibians described in 1942
Taxonomy articles created by Polbot